Brideshead Revisited is a 1981 British television serial starring Jeremy Irons and Anthony Andrews. It was produced by Granada Television for broadcast by the ITV network. Most of the serial was directed by Charles Sturridge, with certain sequences directed by Michael Lindsay-Hogg, who handled the initial phases of the production.

The serial is an adaptation of the novel Brideshead Revisited (1945) by Evelyn Waugh.  It follows, from the 1920s to the early 1940s, the life and romances of the protagonist Charles Ryder—including his friendship with the Flytes, a family of wealthy English Catholics who live in a palatial mansion called Brideshead Castle. The screenplay was written by Derek Granger (the series' producer) and others. Although the credits attribute the screenplay to John Mortimer, Mortimer's script was not used. Charles Sturridge declared that 95% of the dialogue was from Waugh's original text. The 11-episode serial premiered on ITV in the UK on 12 October 1981; on CBC Television in Canada on 19 October 1981; and as part of the Great Performances series on PBS in the US on 18 January 1982.

In 2000, the serial was tenth on the list of the 100 Greatest British Television Programmes compiled by the British Film Institute, based on a poll of industry professionals. In 2007, the serial was listed as one of Time magazine's "100 Best TV Shows of All-Time. In 2010, it was second in The Guardian newspaper's list of the top 50 TV dramas of all time. In 2015, The Telegraph listed it at number 1 in its list of the greatest television adaptations, stating that "Brideshead Revisited is television's greatest literary adaptation, bar none. It's utterly faithful to Evelyn Waugh's novel yet it's somehow more than that, too."

Episodes

Cast

 Jeremy Irons as Charles Ryder
 Anthony Andrews as Lord Sebastian Flyte
 Diana Quick as Lady Julia Flyte (Later in the series as Julia Mottram)
 Simon Jones as Earl of Brideshead, usually referred to as Bridey
 Phoebe Nicholls as Lady Cordelia Flyte
 Claire Bloom as Lady Marchmain
 Laurence Olivier as Lord Marchmain
 John Gielgud as Edward Ryder, Charles's father
 Stéphane Audran as Cara
 Charles Keating as Rex Mottram MP
 Jeremy Sinden as Viscount Boy Mulcaster
 Mona Washbourne as Nanny Hawkins
 John Grillo as Mr. Samgrass
 Nickolas Grace as Anthony Blanche
 Jane Asher as Lady Celia Ryder, Charles's wife, Boy Mulcaster's sister
 Jenny Runacre as Brenda Champion, Rex's ladyfriend
 John Le Mesurier as Father Mowbray
 Michael Bilton as Hayter, butler to the Ryder household
 Bill Owen as Lunt, Charles's manservant at Oxford
 Roger Milner as Wilcox, butler to the Flyte household
 Niall Tóibín as Father Mackay
 Stephen Moore as Jasper, Charles's cousin

Production
The television adaptation of Waugh's novel was originally conceived as a six-hour serial. In the late summer of 1978, producer Derek Granger asked Michael Lindsay-Hogg to direct the serial. Eight months were spent casting, costuming, and scripting, with the critical decision to have voiceover provided by Charles Ryder. In April 1979, Lindsay-Hogg began principal photography on the islands of Gozo and Malta, where the sequences set in Morocco, Mexico, and Central America were filmed. Four months of shooting then followed at locations in England, including Oxford and Castle Howard, which Granger and Lindsay-Hogg had selected as Brideshead. In August, a technicians' strike brought all ITV production to a halt. By the time it was settled in October, Lindsay-Hogg was no longer available due to a prior commitment to another project.

Lindsay-Hogg was replaced by relative novice Charles Sturridge, whose previous experience had been limited to directing episodes of Strangers, Crown Court and Coronation Street. "The actors thought I was part of an insurance scam", Sturridge later said, "and that my inexperience would cause the production to fall through." Cast contracts had to be renegotiated to take into account the extended filming period. Jeremy Irons, who was planning to audition for the film The French Lieutenant's Woman (1981), stipulated he would remain with Brideshead under condition he would be allowed time off to film French Lieutenant if he were cast. Rather than scrap the considerable completed footage in which the actor appeared, Granger agreed.

The break in filming was fortunate in that Laurence Olivier, previously unavailable, could now be cast in the serial. Sturridge and Granger agreed the six-hour script eliminated so much detail of Waugh's story, with its "telling nuances and provocative ideas" that its potency was compromised, and they set about expanding it to seven two-hour episodes. The decision was also made to have the protagonist Charles Ryder narrate the serial as he had in the novel. Olivier's tight schedule required he start immediately, but his scenes had not yet been written, and Sturridge and Granger hurried to complete them so the actor would have at least a week to learn his dialogue. Mona Washbourne was less fortunate and received her script the day she arrived on the set to begin filming.

Shooting resumed on 5 November 1979. The week was divided into five days of filming and two days of writing. Sturridge and Granger were anxious to complete the teleplay as soon as possible, and by the time the ten-day break for Christmas ended, the script was finished. Granada Television had approved a larger budget for the extended format, and Sturridge scheduled the shooting of sequences in Venice, London and on board the RMS Queen Elizabeth 2. Everything was going according to plan, and then Irons was cast in French Lieutenant. Since his character is in nearly every scene of the serial, Sturridge was forced to place Brideshead on a lengthy hiatus. During this period, he edited completed scenes and continued to hone the script, although ultimately John Mortimer received sole screen credit for it. Filming resumed in September 1980. Because French Lieutenant had fallen behind schedule, Irons was forced to work on both projects simultaneously.

The Oxford scenes were filmed largely at Waugh's alma mater, Hertford College, and the rooms Charles occupies in the film were those in which Waugh lived after his second term. Portions of Wadham College and Christ Church were also used. Most of the grounds, all the major public rooms, and several rooms in the private wings of Castle Howard represented Brideshead. Bridgewater House in Westminster was used for the exterior of Marchmain House, and its interiors were filmed in Tatton Hall. Rex and Julia's wedding was filmed in the chapel at Lyme Park. Venice locations included the Basilica di Santa Maria Gloriosa dei Frari, the Scuola di San Rocco, and the Palazzi Barbaro. The ocean-liner deck scenes were filmed on the QE2 during an actual storm, but the ship's interiors were either sets or public rooms in the Adelphi Hotel in Liverpool and the Park Lane Hotel in London.

The riot in the General Strike sequence was the last scene to be filmed, and principal photography was completed in January 1981 after forty-two weeks of filming. Post-production was scheduled for the next seven months. Early into the period, ITV decided two-hour episodes were too lengthy, and Sturridge was forced to restructure the entire serial, beginning and ending it with expanded episodes that would bookend nine episodes running slightly less than an hour each.

Original director Lindsay-Hogg praised Sturridge's work on the serial: "Charles Sturridge ... did fabulous and beautiful work, both with the actors and the camera."

Home media 
On the 40th anniversary of the release of the TV serial (12 October 2021), Britbox released a 4K "remastered" version of Brideshead Revisited. It was not released in the UK.

Music
The music for the series was composed by Geoffrey Burgon. A soundtrack album was released on Chrysalis Records in 1981.

Charts

Awards and nominations

See also
 Brideshead Revisited (2008), film

References

Further reading

External links
 
 

1981 British television series debuts
1981 British television series endings
1980s British drama television series
1980s British LGBT-related television series
BAFTA winners (television series)
Best Miniseries or Television Movie Golden Globe winners
1980s British television miniseries
Films based on works by Evelyn Waugh
ITV television dramas
Television shows based on British novels
Television series by ITV Studios
Television series set in the 1920s
Television series set in the 1930s
Television series set in the 1940s
Television shows set in Oxford
University of Oxford in fiction
Television shows produced by Granada Television
English-language television shows
British LGBT-related drama television series